Don Hammond was a baseball third baseman in the Negro leagues. He played from 1921 to 1926 with the Pittsburgh Keystones, Cleveland Tate Stars, Cleveland Browns, and the Newark Stars.

References

External links
 and Baseball-Reference Black Baseball stats and Seamheads

Cleveland Browns (baseball) players
Cleveland Tate Stars players
Newark Stars players
Pittsburgh Keystones players
Baseball third basemen